(died 1561) was a Japanese daimyō of the Sengoku period, who ruled the area around Miharu, in Mutsu Province. He ordered the construction of Miharu Castle around 1504 AD.

Tamura clan
Daimyo
1561 deaths
Year of birth unknown